Headquarters (HQ) denotes the location where most, if not all, of the important functions of an organization are coordinated. 

Headquarters may also refer to:

 Headquarters (The Monkees album), 1967
 Headquarters (Monkey House album), 2012
 Headquarters, Idaho, an unincorporated community in Clearwater County, Idaho
 Headquarters, Kentucky, an unincorporated community in Nicholas County, Kentucky
 Headquarters, Nebraska, a ghost town in the United States
 Headquarters, New Jersey, an unincorporated community in Hunterdon County, New Jersey

See also
 HQ (disambiguation)